WCBV-LP (105.9 FM) is a radio station licensed to Lima, Ohio, United States; the station serves the Lima area, broadcasting a southern gospel format.  The station is currently owned by Calvary Bible Church.

WCBV is a conservative Christian radio station operated by Calvary Bible Church, an independent, fundamental Baptist church. It operates 24 hours daily featuring conservative Christian music, teaching and preaching. The format of the station represents the church which does not use any form of rock music, contemporary Christian music or southern gospel music.

References

External links
WCBV webpage from Calvary Bible Church website
 

Lima, Ohio
CBV-LP
Radio stations established in 2003
CBV-LP
2003 establishments in Ohio